The ISRO Space Station (ISS) is a planned space station to be constructed by India and operated by Indian Space Research Organisation. The space station would weigh 20 tonnes and maintain an orbit of approximately 400 kilometres above the Earth, where astronauts could stay for 15-20 days. Originally planned to be launched in 2030, it was further postponed to 2035 due to delays led by technical issues related with the Gaganyaan crewed spaceflight mission and the COVID-19 pandemic.

History 
In 2019, Indian Space Research Organisation (ISRO) chief K Sivan presented the features of the proposed space station for the first time, saying that the space station may weigh up to 20 tons. Three years later, in Sivan's new year speech, he stated that India’s first crewed spaceflight project Gaganyaan has completed the design phase and has entered into the testing phase, hinting that the organization has achieved a breakthrough in reaching the space mission milestone.

References 

Indian Space Research Organisation